Mohammad Asri bin Haji Aspar (born 17 January 1996) is a Bruneian international footballer who plays as a midfielder for Kasuka FC of the Brunei Super League.

Club career
Asri was a student of Brunei Sports School while playing for the youth clubs of Muara Vella and afterwards Al-Idrus FC. He signed for Indera SC in 2014 and scored nine goals, including the opener in a crucial 2–0 win against closest rivals MS ABDB, to help his club be champions of the 2014 Brunei Super League.

On 1 April 2018, Asri scored in the final of the 2017-18 Brunei FA Cup against MS PDB to lift the trophy for the first time.

Asri transferred to Kasuka FC when the 2020 Brunei Super League began. He scored on his debut in a 5–0 victory against Kuala Belait FC on 1 March.

Asri played a part at Kasuka's impressive campaign at the 2022 Brunei FA Cup, finishing as runners-up to DPMM FC.

International career
Asri's first involvement with the Brunei national team set-up was the 2014 AFC U-19 Championship qualification matches held in Bangkok, Thailand in October 2013 where Brunei under-19 lost all three matches. In the final fixture, Asri opened the scoring against Singapore before succumbing to a 3-1 loss.

Asri was immediately integrated into the Brunei under-23 squad to compete for the 27th SEA Games held in Myanmar in December 2013. Asri made his debut as a substitute against Indonesia U23 at the Maguwoharjo Stadium on 15 August in a 1–0 loss. He subsequently made two substitute appearances against Singapore and Laos. Brunei came last in their group with zero wins in four.

Asri was selected for the Brunei under-21s at the 2014 Hassanal Bolkiah Trophy. He played in three of the five group stage matches where Brunei failed to progress to the knockout phase by virtue of goal difference.

After a commendable 2018-19 Brunei Super League season for Indera SC, Asri was selected by Robbie Servais to play for the full national team to face Mongolia in the 2022 World Cup qualification matches over two legs, to be played in June 2019. Asri made his international debut for the Wasps in the final minute of additional time in the second leg, which Brunei won 2–1. The victory was not enough to put the Wasps through to Round 2 of the qualification process for the 2022 World Cup and the 2023 Asian Cup due to the aggregate 2–3 loss.

Honours

Indera SC
Brunei Super League: 2014
Brunei FA Cup: 2017–18
Sumbangsih Cup: 2018

Personal life
Asri is a fan of Manchester United of the Premier League and also Johor Darul Ta'zim F.C. of the Malaysia Super League. His brother Azri is also a Brunei youth international.

Asri works as a facility manager at Seri Begawan Religious Teachers University College.

References

External links

1996 births
Living people
Association football midfielders
Bruneian footballers
Brunei international footballers
Indera SC players
Competitors at the 2013 Southeast Asian Games
Southeast Asian Games competitors for Brunei